The 1st constituency of the Orne (French: Première circonscription de l'Orne) is a French legislative constituency in the Orne département. Like the other 576 French constituencies, it elects one MP using a two round electoral system.

Description

The 1st Constituency of the Orne includes the city of Alençon and the southern portion of the department.

Until 2012 the seat had consistently backed candidates from the conservative RPR and its successor the UMP. Unusually the constituency had no candidate from En Marche! at the 2017 election.

Assembly Members

Notes:

Election results

2022

 
 
 
 
 
 
 
|-
| colspan="8" bgcolor="#E9E9E9"|
|-

2017

 
 
 
 
 
 
|-
| colspan="8" bgcolor="#E9E9E9"|
|-

2012

References

1